Agrius cingulata, the pink-spotted hawkmoth or sweetpotato hornworm, is a moth in the family Sphingidae. The species was first described by Johan Christian Fabricius in 1775.

Description 
Its robust body is gray brown with pink bands. The abdomen tapers to a point. The hindwings are gray with black bands and pink at the bases.

Biology 
It is nocturnal. It feeds on the nectar from deep-throated flowers including moonflower (Calonyction aculeatum), morning glories (Convolvulus species), and petunias (Petunia species).

The larva is a large, stout caterpillar with a horn. It feeds during the day and the night on sweet potato (Ipomoea batatas), Datura species, and other plants. It is known as a pest of sweet potato.

Distribution 
This is mainly a neotropical species, and the adults migrate north to Canada and south to Patagonia and the Falkland Islands. It can also be found in the Galápagos Islands and Hawaii. It has been reported from western Europe, including Portugal and the United Kingdom. It has recently become established in West Africa and Cape Verde, possibly having originated in Brazil.

Gallery

References

External links

Pink-Spotted Hawkmoth. Moths of North America.
The Pink-spotted Hawkmoth. Silkmoths.bizland.com

Agrius (moth)
Moths described in 1775
Moths of North America
Moths of South America
Moths of Europe
Moths of Africa
Taxa named by Johan Christian Fabricius